Sherfield may refer to:

 Baron Sherfield, a title in the Peerage of the United Kingdom
 Sherfield on Loddon, a village and civil parish in the English county of Hampshire
 Sherfield Park, a civil parish in the Basingstoke and Deane district of Hampshire, England
 Henry Sherfield (died 1634), English lawyer and politician
 Trent Sherfield (born 1996), American football wide receiver